The Port Gamble S'Klallam Tribe, formerly known as the Port Gamble Indian Community of the Port Gamble Reservation or the Port Gamble Band of S'Klallam Indians is a federally recognized tribe of S'Klallam people, located on the Kitsap Peninsula in Washington. They are an Indigenous peoples of the Northwest Coast.

Reservation
The Port Gamble S'Klallam Reservation, located in the northern part of Kitsap County, Washington. It was founded in 1938 and is collectively held by the tribe. The land is counted by the U.S. Census Bureau as the Port Gamble Tribal Community census-designated place, with an on-site population of 916 as of the 2010 census.

Government
The tribe's headquarters is in Kingston, Washington. The tribe is governed by a democratically elected, six-member tribal council. The current administration is as follows:

 Chairman: Paul Hibbert
 Vice-Chairman:  Scott Moon
 Council Member: Michael Sullivan Jr.
 Council Member: Big Myc
 Council Member: Tanner Cheyney
 Council Member: Chaddy Man.

The tribe ratified its constitution in 1939. To enroll in the tribe, members must have a 1/8 minimum blood quantum.

Language
Traditionally, S'Klallam people speak the S'Klallam language, a Central Salish language. It is very similar to the Saanich dialect of the Straits Salish language. A grammar book has been published in the language, and it is taught in elementary and high school.

Economic development
The Port Gamble S'Klallam Tribe owns and operates the Point Casino, Market Fresh Buffet,
Little Boston Bistro, and Point Julia Deli, all located in Kingston.

Notes

References
 Pritzker, Barry M. A Native American Encyclopedia: History, Culture, and Peoples. Oxford: Oxford University Press, 2000. .

External links
 Port Gamble S'Klallam Tribe, official website

Klallam
Native American tribes in Washington (state)
Geography of Kitsap County, Washington
Federally recognized tribes in the United States
Indigenous peoples of the Pacific Northwest Coast